Jonathan Gershenzon (born 1955) is an American biochemist.

Scientific career 
After studying biology as an undergraduate at the University of California in Santa Cruz, Gershenzon received his PhD in botany from the University of Texas in 1984. From 1985 until 1997 he worked as a scientist at the Institute for Biological Chemistry, Washington State University in Pullman. Since 1997 he is a Director and Scientific Member at the Max Planck Institute for Chemical Ecology in Jena, Germany,  where he heads the Department of Biochemistry. He was appointed  Honorary Professor at Friedrich Schiller University Jena in 1999.
He is married to Kimberly Falk and is the father of Camille and Julia Gershenzon.

Gershenzon studies the biochemistry of secondary plant metabolites, their mode of action on herbivores, the regulation of secondary metabolisms in plants and the evolution of pathways. Most of the work in his department focuses on two major groups of plant defenses: glucosinolates and terpenoids.

Awards and honors
 National Science Foundation Graduate Fellow, University of Texas, 1978
 Robert A. Welch Graduate Fellow, University of Texas, 1981
 Haarman and Reimer Lecturer, Washington State University 2000
 Duane LeTourneau Lectureship, University of Idaho 2000
 Elected Member of the American Association for the Advancement of Science (AAAS) 2012 
 Elected Member of the German National Academy of Sciences Leopoldina 2021

Selected publications

 Gershenzon, J. (1994). Metabolic costs of terpenoid accumulation in higher-plants. Journal of Chemical Ecology, 20(6), 1281–1328. 
 Lambrix, V., Reichelt, M., Mitchell-Olds, T., Kliebenstein, D. J., Gershenzon, J. (2001). The Arabidopsis epithiospecifier protein promotes the hydrolysis of glucosinolates to nitriles and influences Trichoplusia ni herbivory. The Plant Cell, 13(12), 2793–2807. doi: 10.1105/tpc.010261
 Pichersky, E., Gershenzon, J. (2002). The formation and function of plant volatiles: perfumes for pollinator attraction and defense. Current Opinion in Plant Biology, 5(3), 237–243. 
 Wittstock, U., Agerbirk, N., Stauber, E. J., Olsen, C. E., Hippler, M., Mitchell-Olds, T., Gershenzon, J., Vogel, H. (2004). Successful herbivore attack due to metabolic diversion of a plant chemical defense. Proceedings of the National Academy of Sciences of the United States of America, 101(14), 4859–4864. 
 Dudareva, N., Andersson, S., Orlova, I., Gatto, N., Reichelt, M., Rhodes, D., Boland, W., Gershenzon, J. (2005). The nonmevalonate pathway supports both monoterpene and sesquiterpene formation in snapdragon flowers. Proceedings of the National Academy of Sciences of the United States of America, 102(3), 933–938. 
 Rasmann, S., Köllner, T. G., Degenhardt, J., Hiltpold, I., Toepfer, S., Kuhlmann, U., Gershenzon, J., Turlings, T. C. J. (2005). Recruitment of entomopathogenic nematodes by insect-damaged maize roots. Nature, 434, 732–737. 
 Halkier, B. A., Gershenzon, J. (2006). Biology and biochemistry of glucosinolates. Annual Review of Plant Biology, 57, 303–333. 
 Gershenzon, J., Dudareva, N. (2007). The function of terpene natural products in the natural world. Nature Chemical Biology, 3(7), 408–414. 
 Wouters, F.C., Reichelt, M., Glauser, G., Bauer, E., Erb, M., Gershenzon, J., Vassão, D.G. (2014). Reglucosylation of the benzoxazinoid DIMBOA with inversion of stereochemical configuration is a detoxification strategy in lepidopteran herbivores. Angewandte Chemie − International Edition, 53(42), 11320–11324.

References

External links 
Webpage of the Department of Biochemistry at the Max Planck Institute for Chemical Ecology

Video 
 Video on Jonathan Gershenzon's research (Latest Thinking)

1955 births
Living people
University of Texas at Austin College of Natural Sciences alumni
University of California, Santa Cruz alumni
American biochemists
Chemical ecologists
Max Planck Institute directors
University of Texas alumni